Formula Regional (FR) is an FIA-approved moniker for certified regional one-make Formula Three championships with the concept being approved during the FIA World Motor Sport Council meeting in December 2017. The first series under new regulations were launched in Asia and North America in 2018, followed by European counterpart in 2019 and Japanese in 2020. This step of FIA Global Pathway ladder serves to close the performance gap between Formula 4 (160 bhp) and global Formula 3 Championship (380 bhp), being powered by 270 bhp engines. On 13 December, it was announced that the Toyota Racing Series would be rebranded as Formula Regional Oceania Championhsip.

Championships

See also

 FIA Formula 3, the international multiregional F3 championship
 Formula 5000, 5.0-L 5000-cc, open-wheel open-cockpit single-seat racecar category
 Formula 4000, 4.0-L 4000-cc, open-wheel open-cockpit single-seat racecar category
 Formula 3000, 3.0-L 3000-cc, open-wheel open-cockpit single-seat racecar category
 Formula 2000 (disambiguation), 2.0-L 2000-cc, open-wheel open-cockpit single-seat racecar category
 Formula 1000, 1.0-L 1000-cc, open-wheel open-cockpit single-seat racecar category
 Formula 500, 0.5-L 500-cc, open-wheel open-cockpit single-seat racecar category

 Formula Three, open-wheel open-cockpit single-seat racecar category
 Formula Two, open-wheel open-cockpit single-seat racecar category
 Formula One, open-wheel open-cockpit single-seat racecar championship
 List of Formula Regional champions

References